Rāfiʿ ibn Abīʾl-Layl ibn ʿUlayyān al-Kalbī, also known by his laqab (honorific epithet) ʿIzz al-Dawla, was the emir of the Kalb tribe of Syria in the mid-11th century.

Life
Rafi succeeded his uncle, Sinan ibn Ulayyan, as emir of the Kalb after the latter's death in 1028. Sinan had entered the Kalb into an alliance against the Fatimid Caliphate with two other Bedouin tribal confederations, the Tayy under Hassan ibn Mufarrij and the Kilab under Salih ibn Mirdas. However, under Rafi, the Kalb defected to the Fatimids. This occurred after Rafi' declared his loyalty to Caliph az-Zahir in return for control of Sinan's iqtaʿat (fiefs). When the Fatimids dispatched Anushtakin al-Dizbari to confront the Tayy and Kilab, Rafi and the Kalb fought alongside him at the decisive Battle of al-Uqhuwana near Lake Tiberias. After the battle, during which Salih was slain, Rafi' identified his body and that of his son, decapitated them and sent their heads to Anushtakin. The Kalb under Rafi later participated in Anushtakin's campaign against Salih's successor, Shibl al-Dawla Nasr, in 1038, which ended in Nasr's slaying and the Fatimids' recapture of Aleppo.

Druze tradition
Rafi is considered a hero in the Druze tradition for fighting Salih ibn Mirdas and using his wealth to protect and support the Druze in Syria. The Druze missionary Baha al-Din praised Rafi for protecting the oppressed in an epistle to Arab tribal chiefs in 1031. He later became considered a saintly figure of the Druze.

References

Bibliography

11th-century Arabs
11th-century Syrian people
Banu Kalb
Bedouin tribal chiefs
Syria under the Fatimid Caliphate
History of the Druze